Cyrée Jarelle Johnson (born 1990) is an American poet, editor, and librarian. He co-founded the literary magazine Deaf Poets Society and is currently a librarian at Pratt Institute. His debut poetry collection Slingshot received a Lambda Literary Award for Gay Poetry.

Early life and education  
Johnson was raised in Piscataway, New Jersey, and grew up a household he described as  "abusive".

He received his bachelor's degree from Hampshire College and completed his MFA in creative writing at Columbia University in 2019.

Johnson was diagnosed with autism when he was about four years old and with lupus in college. He stated in an interview for Mashable, "Autism scholarship characterizes folks on the spectrum as 'black and white thinkers' — and that's quite true for me. What I love, I love with verve and fervor. What I hate, I hate with verve and fervor."

Career 
Johnson is co-founder and poetry editor of Deaf Poets Society literary magazine, which was created in 2016 to specifically center works by writers with disabilities and those who are d/Deaf. The magazine was developed with accessibility in mind, such as providing works in various formats including text, audio, and images.

Johnson is an assistant professor and Diversity, Equity, and Inclusion Librarian at Pratt Institute. He is also a former Chapter Lead for Black Lives Matter Philadelphia.

He described his work as indirectly addressing disability and "what [he] had to do to stay alive." He published his debut poetry collection Slingshot in 2019 under Nightboat Books. In a New York Times review Stephanie Burt described the collection: "It’s challenging work, in its language, its stories, its subcultural references (“prince died for fem bois”), yet it offers pellucid queer intimacies."

Personal life 
Johnson is transmasculine and uses he/him pronouns. Johnson is gay. He is married to Azure D Osborne-Lee and they reside in Brooklyn.

Accolades 
 2020 - Lambda Literary Award for Gay Poetry (for Slingshot)
 2020 - Ruth Lilly and Dorothy Sargent Rosenberg Poetry Fellowship, Poetry Foundation

Works

 2019. Slingshot. First edition paperback, publication date 17 September 2019, Nightboat Books.

References

External links 
 Official website

1990 births
Living people
People from Piscataway, New Jersey
Writers from New Jersey
Poets from New Jersey
African-American poets
African-American librarians
American librarians
Artists with disabilities
American gay writers
LGBT African Americans
Hampshire College alumni
Columbia University School of the Arts alumni
Pratt Institute faculty
Lambda Literary Award for Gay Poetry winners
LGBT people from New Jersey
People on the autism spectrum
People with lupus
21st-century African-American people
21st-century LGBT people
African-American male writers
American transgender writers